Mohamed Ali Moncer (born 28 April 1991) is a Tunisian professional footballer who plays as a midfielder for Mesaimeer on loan from CS Sfaxien.

International career

International goals 
Scores and results list Tunisia's goal tally first.

|-
| 1. || 18 January 2015 || Nuevo Estadio de Ebebiyín, Ebebiyín, Equatorial Guinea ||  ||  ||  || 2015 Africa Cup of Nations || 
|-
| 2. || 31 March 2015 || Nanjing Olympic Sports Centre, Nanjing, China ||  ||  ||  || Friendly || 
|-
| 3. || 31 January 2016 || Stade Régional Nyamirambo, Kigali, Rwanda ||  ||  ||  || 2016 African Nations Championship  || 
|}

Honours 
CS Sfaxien
Winner
 Tunisian Ligue Professionnelle 1: 2012–13
 CAF Confederation Cup: 2013
 Tunisian Cup: 2018–19

Runner-up
 Tunisian Ligue Professionnelle 1: 2013–14
 CAF Confederation Cup: 2010
 CAF Super Cup: 2014
 Tunisian Cup: 2012, 2013–14

ES Tunis
Winner
 Tunisian Ligue Professionnelle 1: 2017–18

External links 
 
 

1991 births
Living people
Tunisian footballers
Tunisian expatriate footballers
Association football midfielders
Tunisia international footballers
CS Sfaxien players
Espérance Sportive de Tunis players
Al Ittihad Alexandria Club players
Al-Muharraq SC players
Mesaimeer SC players
Tunisian Ligue Professionnelle 1 players
Egyptian Premier League players
Bahraini Premier League players
2015 Africa Cup of Nations players
Tunisian expatriate sportspeople in Egypt
Tunisian expatriate sportspeople in Bahrain
Tunisian expatriate sportspeople in Qatar
Expatriate footballers in Egypt
Expatriate footballers in Bahrain
Expatriate footballers in Qatar
Tunisia A' international footballers
2016 African Nations Championship players